J.G.A. "Jan" Baas  (born October 24, 1950) is a Dutch politician. He is a member of the Labour Party (PvdA).

Baas was an alderman of Beverwijk from 1990 to 1996 and mayor of Wieringen from 1996 to 2004. Since 2004 he has been mayor of Enkhuizen.

References

1950 births
Living people
Aldermen in North Holland
People from Beverwijk
Dutch civil servants
Labour Party (Netherlands) politicians
Mayors in North Holland
People from Enkhuizen
People from Wieringen